Roslan bin Ahmad is a Malaysian politician and served as Malacca State Executive Councillor.

Election results

Honours
  :
  Companion Class I of the Exalted Order of Malacca (DMSM) – Datuk (2014)

References

Living people
United Malays National Organisation politicians
Malaysian people of Malay descent
Malaysian Muslims
Members of the Malacca State Legislative Assembly
Malacca state executive councillors
21st-century Malaysian politicians
Year of birth missing (living people)